Uropterygius fasciolatus is a moray eel found in coral reefs in the western central Pacific Ocean. It was first named by Regan in 1909, and is commonly known as the blotched moray, barred moray, or the Gosline's snake moray.

References

fasciolatus
Fish described in 1909